Wang Dongfeng (born February 1958) is a Chinese politician who is the current secretary-general of the Chinese People's Political Consultative Conference. He was formerly the Communist Party secretary of Hebei province and mayor of Tianjin, one of the four direct-controlled municipalities of China. Born in Xi'an, Wang spent his early career in his home province of Shaanxi. He then served in the State Administration for Industry and Commerce before being transferred to Tianjin.

Biography
Wang Dongfeng was born in Xi'an. He graduated with a master's degree in economics from Xi'an Jiaotong University. In 1981 he began work at a tourism supplier company in Xi'an. Between 1984 and 1986 he worked for the city's financial and trade affairs office. Then he made his way into the Xi'an municipal government, serving as secretary in the city's party committee general office. In 1998, he was named the director of the Industry and Commerce Administration of Shaanxi province. Then in 2001 he was named mayor of Weinan. He then became party chief of Tongchuan. 

In July 2004, Wang was transferred to become deputy director of the State Administration for Industry and Commerce. In April 2013, he was named Deputy Party Secretary of Tianjin. In September 2016, following the dismissal and disciplinary investigation into Huang Xingguo, Wang was named mayor of Tianjin. He was confirmed on November 6. 

In October 2017, Wang was appointed as the Communist Party Secretary of Hebei.

Wang is a member of the 19th Central Committee of the Chinese Communist Party. He was also a member of the 18th Central Commission for Discipline Inspection.

References

1958 births
Living people
Mayors of Tianjin
Members of the 19th Central Committee of the Chinese Communist Party
People's Republic of China politicians from Shaanxi
Chinese Communist Party politicians from Shaanxi
Politicians from Xi'an
Vice Chairpersons of the National Committee of the Chinese People's Political Consultative Conference